Valencia Airport , also known as Manises Airport, is the tenth-busiest Spanish airport in terms of passengers and second in the region after Alicante. The airport has flight connections to about 20 European countries and 8.53 million passengers passed through the airport in 2019.

History
The airport is the main base of Iberia's regional carrier Air Nostrum. Irish low-cost airline Ryanair used the airport as a hub since 2007 but decided to close it in November 2008 following a dispute over subsidies by the airport authorities. Since then the airline has continued to operate out of Valencia but as a relatively large destination airport, and not a base.

Valencia's first transatlantic flight, a Delta Air Lines Boeing 757 from New York City's JFK Airport, landed in June 2009. The route operated every summer until Delta announced in late 2012 that it would withdraw from the Spanish city the following year; the airline attributed its decision to the flight's poor financial performance and to rising fuel costs.

Facilities

Terminal
Valencia Airport consists of a single terminal that has been built in three stages which are directly connected to each other. The landside hall consists of three check-in areas: 1-12 is the newest one with the airport station beneath it, 13-42 is the oldest main building with a currently derelict upper floor, 43-56 is the largest annex housing most airlines. A single central security area leads to the airside with gates 1-22, with gates 1-4 being the newest area designated for non-Schengen flights. Gates 12-22 are located in a separate hall designated as a regional terminal that opened in time for the 2007 America's Cup which allows walk-boarding, mainly for flights by Iberia Regional and low-cost carriers. Some of the gates are equipped with jet bridges. The airside area features several food outlets and shops, however Starbucks and Burger King have been closed for good in the wake of the COVID-19 pandemic.

Runway and apron
The former runway 04/22 is not in use and has no ILS but has a helipad at the southwestern end.

Airlines and destinations

Passenger

Cargo

Statistics

Ground transport

Road
Valencia airport is situated adjacent to the Autovía A-3 highway which connects Valencia with Madrid and is also close to the Autovía A-7 coastal route to Barcelona. It is connected to the city of Valencia by a regular bus line operated by Fernanbus which takes between 30 and 35 minutes and passes through Mislata, Quart de Poblet and Manises.

Rail
The metro network Metrovalencia with lines 3 and 5 on the airport station connect the airport to the city centre (15 minutes), the main Railway Station of the city Estació del Nord (20 minutes) and the port of Valencia (30 minutes).

See also
Manises Air Base

References

External links

 Official website 

Airports in the Valencian Community
Buildings and structures in Manises
Airport
Airports established in 1930